is a Japanese field hockey player. He competed in the 1960 Summer Olympics.

References

External links
 

1931 births
Possibly living people
Field hockey players at the 1960 Summer Olympics
Japanese male field hockey players
Olympic field hockey players of Japan
Sportspeople from Osaka Prefecture